Eva Olga Sofia Wistam, during a time Eriksson, née Eklöf (born 15 May 1966, Lidingö, Stockholm County, Sweden) is a Swedish television host on TV4 and TV3 and radio talk-show host. She has also worked as a stylist for stars such as Carola, Jerry Williams and Tommy Nilsson. In 2008, she was also a judge on the talent show Sweden's Got Talent, during this year she also hosted her own radio show on Rix FM.

During 2009, Wistam hosted the competition show Wipeout on Swedish television. She would return for the 2010 series however she was replaced  by Christine Meltzer for Winter Wipeout.

Wistam was an celebrity dancer in Let's Dance 2013. As of June 2022 she hosts the Swedish version of Naked Attraction.

References

External links

Living people
1966 births
Swedish television hosts
Swedish women television presenters
People from Lidingö Municipality
Beauty pageant hosts